Sikh Holocaust may refer to:
 Sikh holocaust of 1762 or Vaddā Ghallūghārā (Punjabi for "Great Massacre"), the mass killing of up to one-third or half the Sikh population by Afghani Durrani Forces
 Sikh holocaust of 1746 or Chhōtā Ghallūghārā (Punjabi for "Lesser Massacre"), a massacre of a significant proportion of the Sikh population by invading Pashtun people of Afghanistan's Durrani Empire during the waning years of the Mughal Empire